The United Aircraft and Transport Corporation was formed in 1929, when William Boeing of Boeing Airplane & Transport Corporation teamed up with Frederick Rentschler of Pratt & Whitney to form a large, vertically-integrated, amalgamated firm, uniting business interests in all aspects of aviation—a combination of airframe and aircraft engine manufacturing and airline business, to serve all aviation markets, both civil aviation (cargo, passenger, private, air mail) and military aviation.

With headquarters at Hartford, Connecticut, the holding company controlled the stock of the Boeing Airplane Company of Seattle, the Chance Vought Corporation, the Hamilton Aero Manufacturing Company (a propeller manufacturer), and the Pratt & Whitney Aircraft Company, an aeroengine manufacturer. Sikorsky Aviation Corporation, the Stearman Aircraft Company of Wichita, Kansas, and the Standard Steel Propeller Company were added to United's portfolio shortly thereafter, followed by several airlines also brought into the fold. The airline interests were soon grouped under a new management company known as United Air Lines, Inc. However, the individual airlines (as well as the individual companies held by United) continued to operate under their own names.

After the Air Mail scandal of 1934, the U.S. government concluded that such large holding companies as United Aircraft and Transport were anti-competitive, and new antitrust laws were passed forbidding airframe or aircraft engine manufacturers from having interests in airlines. This law forced United Aircraft and Transport to split into three separate companies.  Its manufacturing interests east of the Mississippi River (Pratt & Whitney, Sikorsky, Vought, and Hamilton Standard Propeller Company) were merged as United Aircraft Corporation (later United Technologies Corporation), headquartered in Hartford CT with Rentschler as president. The western manufacturing interests (including Northrop Aviation Corporation, formerly Avion Corporation), became Boeing Airplane Company, headquartered in Seattle WA. The airline interests were merged into a single airline, United Air Lines, Inc., headquartered in Chicago IL.

References

Notes

Bibliography

 
 

Defunct aircraft manufacturers of the United States
Boeing
Airline holding companies of the United States
Transportation companies of the United States
American companies established in 1929
Holding companies established in 1929
Vehicle manufacturing companies established in 1929
Vehicle manufacturing companies disestablished in 1934
1929 establishments in Connecticut
1934 disestablishments in Connecticut
United Technologies
American companies disestablished in 1934
Holding companies disestablished in 1934
Defunct manufacturing companies based in Connecticut
Transportation companies based in Connecticut